Santa Fe Christian Schools is a private, college preparatory Christian school located in Solana Beach, California,  founded in 1977.

External links
Official website

Christian schools in California
Schools in San Diego County, California
Solana Beach, California
Private elementary schools in California
Private middle schools in California
Private high schools in California
High schools in San Diego County, California